Iranecio is a genus of flowering plants in the sunflower family, native to the eastern Mediterranean east to the Caucasus.

 Species

References

Senecioneae
Asteraceae genera